Delisser Land District is a land district (cadastral division) of Western Australia, located within the Eastern and Eucla land divisions on the Nullarbor Plain. It spans roughly 29°00'S - 31°00'S in latitude and 126°30'E - 129°00'E in longitude.  It was named after E.A. Delisser who surveyed and described the Nullarbor Plain in the 1860s.

The district was created on 20 October 1916 and was defined in the Government Gazette:

Notes

References
 

Land districts of Western Australia
Goldfields-Esperance